LC Five Martina is a futsal club based in Martina Franca, Apulia, Italy.

Current squad

External links
Official Website
Divisione Calcio a 5

Futsal clubs in Italy
LCF Martina
Sport in Apulia
Futsal clubs established in 2009